George Graham Vest (December 6, 1830August 9, 1904) was a U.S. politician. Born in Frankfort, Kentucky, he was known for his skills in oration and debate. Vest, a lawyer as well as a politician, served as a Missouri Congressman, a Confederate Congressman during the Civil War, and finally a U.S. Senator.

Vest was best known during his lifetime for his "a man's best friend" closing arguments from the trial in which damages were sought for the killing of a dog named Old Drum on October 18, 1869. But his greatest legacy is as the apparent originator of the phrase "history is written by the victors.” While its origin is not definitively known, Vest used it to promote the Lost Cause of the Confederacy.

Early life and career
Vest graduated from Centre College, Danville, Kentucky, in 1848 and from the law department of Transylvania University, Lexington, Kentucky, in 1853. He was admitted to the bar in 1853 and planned to move to California. However, while en route, he stopped in Pettis County, Missouri, where he defended a young African-American man accused of murder. Vest's client was acquitted but soon burned at the stake by an angry mob. Vest's own life was also threatened, but he nonetheless decided to stay in Missouri permanently, settling in Georgetown. In 1854 he married Sallie Sneed of Danville, Kentucky. They had three children, two sons and a daughter.

Initial public service
In 1860, after moving to Boonville, Missouri, he was elected to the Missouri House of Representatives and served as a Democratic presidential elector. As a Missouri representative he was chairman of the Committee on Federal Relations. Vest served in the House until late 1861 during which he wrote the Vest Resolutions in which he denounced coercion of the South.

When the Civil War broke out Vest was a strong advocate of maintaining slavery during the Missouri secession crisis, and eventually sided with the Confederacy. He proposed the Secession Ordinance that was passed by the Missouri legislature in October 1861. The following year, he briefly served as judge advocate with the Army of Missouri, commanded by former Governor Sterling Price. He served in the House of Representatives of the Confederate Congress from February 1862 to January 12, 1865, when he resigned, having been appointed to fill a vacancy in the Confederate Senate.

Old Drum

After the war he returned to Pettis County moving to Sedalia, Missouri, and resumed his law practice. It was at this time in 1869 that Vest was asked to represent Charles Burden and Old Drum in the case that would make him famous, Burden v. Hornsby.

Vest took the case tried on September 23, 1870, in which he represented a client whose hunting dog, a foxhound named Drum (or Old Drum), had been killed by a sheep farmer, Leonidas Hornsby. The farmer (Burden's brother-in-law) had previously announced his intentions to kill any dog found on his property; the dog's owner was suing for damages in the amount of
$150, the maximum allowed by law.

During the trial, Vest stated that he would "win the case or apologize to every dog in Missouri." 
Vest's closing argument to the jury made no reference to any of the testimony offered during the trial, and instead offered a eulogy of sorts. Vest's "Eulogy of the Dog" is one of the most enduring passages of purple prose in American courtroom history (only a partial transcript has survived):

Vest won the case (the jury awarded $50 to the dog's owner) and also won its appeal to the Missouri Supreme Court. A bust of the dog resides in the Missouri Supreme Court building in Jefferson City, Missouri. In 1958, a statue of the dog was erected on the Johnson County Courthouse lawn containing a summation of Vest’s closing speech, “A man’s best friend is his dog.”

Movie depictions
The speech has been used in movies which are set in Missouri and involve sheep owners who allegedly shoot the dog but are then shot themselves by the dog's owners, who are then tried for murder.

 The Voice of Bugle Ann – 1936
 Tribute to the Dog, episode 9, season 13 of Death Valley Days (TV series), featuring Ronald Reagan in the role of George Vest – 1964
 The Trial of Old Drum – 2000

U.S. Senate

In 1877 Vest moved to Kansas City, Missouri, where he was elected two years later in 1879 to the United States Senate. He was chairman on the Committee on Public Buildings and Grounds (Fifty-third Congress) and served on the Committee on Epidemic Diseases (Fifty-fourth Congress), Committee on Public Health and National Quarantine (Fifty-fourth through Fifty-seventh Congresses). He was re-elected for three more terms in 1885, 1891 and 1897 and remained a US Senator until March 4, 1903, when he retired from public life due to ill health.

Defender of Yellowstone
In 1882, Vest became aware of concession abuses and outright attempts at uncontrolled monopolies being proposed for Yellowstone National Park concessions by the railroads and other businessmen. He introduced and eventually helped pass legislation that required the Secretary of Interior to submit concession and construction contracts to the Senate for oversight thus stifling potential corruption and abuses. Throughout the remainder of his Senate career, Vest was considered the "Self-appointed Protector of Yellowstone National Park."

Death
On August 9, 1904, Vest died at his summer home in Sweet Springs, Missouri, the last living Confederate States Senator. He was buried at Bellefontaine Cemetery in St. Louis, Missouri.

Notes

External links
, loosely based on the Old Drum case

A Tribute to the Best Friend of Man: Eulogy of the Dog (Violet Press 2008) A verbatim transcript of the speech read into the Congressional Record in 1916, newly illustrated by Jackie Ehle
 

|-

|-

1830 births
1904 deaths
Centre College alumni
Confederate States of America senators
19th-century American politicians
Democratic Party United States senators from Missouri
Deputies and delegates to the Provisional Congress of the Confederate States
Democratic Party members of the Missouri House of Representatives
Members of the Confederate House of Representatives from Missouri
Politicians from Frankfort, Kentucky
People from Sedalia, Missouri
Politicians from Kansas City, Missouri
Transylvania University alumni
Burials at Bellefontaine Cemetery
People from Sweet Springs, Missouri